The Dryden Observer was a weekly publication based in Dryden, Ontario, Canada, and was originally established as the Wabigoon Star in 1897. 

The newspaper was published by Norwest Printing and Publishing Group, who acquired the paper from Alex Wilson Coldstream Ltd, its long-time owners (since 1940). It ceased publication in May 2019.

External links
 Official website

1897 establishments in Ontario
2019 disestablishments in Ontario
Defunct newspapers published in Ontario
Defunct weekly newspapers
Mass media in Dryden, Ontario
Publications established in 1897
Publications disestablished in 2019
Weekly newspapers published in Ontario